The Windsor Royals are a Canadian Junior C ice hockey team based in Windsor, Nova Scotia. For their first three seasons the club was known as the Avon River Rats and they played in the Nova Scotia Junior C Hockey League. The team was advised they were in copyright violation with the River Rats.  Prior to the 2018-19 season they obtained the name of the Windsor Royals (formerly a team in the league which folded) and re-branded the organization. They are coached by Mike LaPierre. They have historically been a playoff contender, but rarely progressing deep.

Season-by-season record
Note: GP = Games played, W = Wins, L = Losses, OTL = Overtime Losses, Pts = Points, GF = Goals for, GA = Goals against, PIM = Penalties in minutes

References

External links
 Nova Scotia Jr C Page
 River Rats Page

Ice hockey teams in Nova Scotia
2012 establishments in Nova Scotia
Ice hockey clubs established in 2012